BNL BNP Paribas headquarters (2016), also known as Orizzonte Europa, is an office building in Rome.  It was designed in a contemporary all-glass style by Alfonso Femia and Gianluca Peluffo. The building has a LEED certification for its energy efficiency. The most unique feature about the building is that it is tall and thin with a glass facade that protrudes at angles. The structure was built for the BNL-BNP Paribas Group which is Italy's sixth largest bank.

Design 
The structure is built near the Roma Tiburtina railway station. The building is 16 stories tall with 12 stories above ground and four below ground. The facade of the building has glass which is positioned at alternating angles. The builders refer to the glass protrusions as following the principle of the "Two-faced Janus". The unique appearance also helps to ventilate the building. There are ventilation areas in parts of the façade which are ceramic.

This gives the surface area three dimensions. These cause the light from the Sun to reflect at angles. Because of the natural lighting the building uses 30% less energy and has a LEED certification from the Green Building Certification Institute.

Amenities 
The building has a health clinic, a restaurant, a school for kindergarteners and a gym. It also has an auditorium and a catering area that seats 700. There are four stories of underground parking.

Awards 
"The Plan 2016" award, best property development for office use.

References 

BNP Paribas
Buildings and structures in Rome
Modernist architecture
Buildings and structures completed in 2016
Headquarters in Italy
Office buildings completed in 2016
2016 establishments in Italy